Bu Sidra (also spelled Abu Sidra) is a district in Qatar, located in the municipality of Al Rayyan.

In the 2015 census, it was listed as a district of zone no. 55 which has a population of 283,675 and also includes New Fereej Al Ghanim, Al Aziziya, Al Waab, Fereej Al Soudan, Muaither, Al Mearad, Fereej Al Manaseer, Fereej Al Murra and Al Sailiya. 

Fereej Al Manaseer is located to the immediate east.

Etymology
The first part of the district's name, "abu", translates to "father" and is used as a prefix for geographical features. "Sidra" is a reference to the sidr tree (Ziziphus nummularia) which grows abundantly in the area.

Infrastructure
Ashghal (The Public Works Authority) launched a QR 2.6 million project to construct a religious complex in Bu Sidra in November 2013. Maha Al Khaleej for Contracting Co. was selected as the contractor. As part of the project, a 200 worshipper capacity mosque, an imam's house and an ablution block were constructed.

Education
The following schools are located in Bu Sidra:

References

Populated places in Al Rayyan